The Coco River is a river of Tocantins state in central Brazil. It is a tributary of the Araguaia River.

Lower course

The lower portion of the Coco River forms the eastern boundary of the Cantão State Park, and the western boundary of the Ilha do Bananal/Cantão Environmental Protection Area.
This section was probably originally a meander of the Javaés River, in turn a branch of the Araguaia.
The frequently flooded Cantão region between the Coco and Araguaia rivers holds an ecotone between the Amazon and Cerrado biomes.

See also
List of rivers of Tocantins

References

Sources

Rivers of Tocantins